Anle is a town in Luolong District, Luoyang, Henan province, China. , it has 16 villages under its administration.

References

Township-level divisions of Henan
Luoyang